Avatha spilota is a species of moth of the family Erebidae first described by James John Joicey and George Talbot in 1917. It is found in Papua, Indonesia, where it has been recorded from the Anggi Lakes, Mount Goliath and the Pass Valley.

References

Moths described in 1917
Avatha
Moths of Indonesia